The 88 is the debut album from New Zealand band Minuit. The album achieved gold certification in New Zealand.

Track listing 
 "The Boy with the Aubergine Hair"
 "Claire"
 "Menace"
 "Species II"
 "Except You"
 "Queen 88"
 "Djordj"
 "Milk"
 "a.m. e.m."
 "Body-Shaped Box"
 "Nymphs"
 "Soviet Air Hostess"
 "Aires"
 "Jumble"

Chart performance

References

2003 albums
Minuit (band) albums